Sonic the Hedgehog was an American comic book series published by Archie Comics, in partnership with Sega. The series was based on Sega's video game franchise, as well as on the 1993 animated series of the same name. After initially beginning with a four-issue miniseries from February to May 1993 (actually November 1992 to February 1993 as the cover dates did not reflect the actual publication dates of the issues), the first full-length issue of the comic was published in July 1993 (actually April 1993). The series ran for 290 issues for over 20 years, earning a place in the 2008 Guinness World Records for being the "longest-running comic series based on a video game", and it became the longest-running franchise-based comic series in 2015, surpassing Marvel Comics' Conan the Barbarian (which ran for 275 issues) before it was confirmed cancelled in July 2017 (although the comics ceased release in January of that year), following Sega and Archie Comics' decision to discontinue their business relationship. The series features a cast of hundreds of characters, consisting of both those derived from the Sonic games and those original to the comics, with stories focused on a crime-fighting organization called the Freedom Fighters, led by Sonic, as they face off against series antagonist Doctor Eggman alongside a variety of other villains.

While the series largely consists of its own continuity, certain issues implemented aspects of the Sonic video games into their plots and settings. Following a lawsuit in 2013 by former writer Ken Penders, Archie rebooted the series, removing several characters from the comics' continuity and moving it closer to that of the games. Over its history, the series had a number of spin-off publications being created – these include Sonic Universe, which focuses on stories revolving around different side characters from the main series; Knuckles the Echidna, focusing on adventures involving Knuckles and his friends the Chaotix; Sonic X, a comic series based on the 2003 Japanese anime of the same name; and Sonic Boom, a comic series based on both the cartoon series and the video game series of the same name. In addition, the comic series had two crossovers with Archie's Mega Man comic-book series, based on the Mega Man video games from Capcom.

A succeeding series of Sonic comics by IDW Publishing began serialization from April 2018, following IDW's acquisition of the Sonic license. Ian Flynn, who formerly worked on the Archie series, was recruited by IDW to help with producing stories for the new series.

Publication history
The Sonic the Hedgehog comic debuted in the US as a four-part miniseries (cover-dated 1992 to February 1993). This was followed up two months later by the series Sonic the Hedgehog (April 1993 – December 2016). Numerous one-shot specials and several reprint series' followed.

Synopsis
The comics follow the adventures of Sonic the Hedgehog and his friends, called the Freedom Fighters, who battle against the evil Doctor Robotnik. Initially based on the plot of the 1993 animated series, the comic later incorporated elements from the video games and other media. Ken Penders, former writer of the comic, sued Sega, EA, and Archie Comics for copyright infringements, leading to a continuity reboot with all established characters created by Penders and other writers being removed, save those of current writer Ian Flynn, who penned the new continuity, and those created for assorted animated series, to which Sega retains the rights. The new continuity is a world much more closer to the world depicted in Sega's games.

The original universe, which remained canon until the comic's 247th issue, is set on the planet Mobius, an alternate version of Earth where animals were mutated into the anthropomorphic Mobians. Dr. Robotnik is depicted as a tyrant, ruling from Robotropolis, following a coup d'état against the Kingdom of Acorn. A small band of heroes, the Freedom Fighters, fight back against his forces from the secluded village of Knothole. Amongst the group are Sonic, his best friend Miles "Tails" Prower, love interest and team leader Princess Sally Acorn, French-accented Antoine D’Coolette, cybernetic Bunnie Rabbot, technician Rotor the Walrus, and Sally's handheld computer Nicole. Other allies like Knuckles the Echidna, Amy Rose, and Sonic's Uncle Chuck join them in later chapters. Robotnik in turn is aided by his nephew Snively.

Robotnik meets his demise in the fiftieth issue, erased from existence by his own superweapon. An alternate version of Robotnik from a parallel world becomes the lead antagonist, first introduced as "Robo-Robotnik", but later takes on the name of Dr. Eggman. New antagonists were introduced, including the evil sorcerer Ixis Naugus; Scourge the Hedgehog, Sonic's evil counterpart from a parallel universe; and the Dark Egg Legion, a union of other factions like the Iron Dominion and the echidna-led Dark Legion. Game storylines like Sonic Adventure and Sonic Adventure 2 were adapted, introducing Shadow the Hedgehog as a recurring character.

The Xorda, an extraterrestrial race whose past actions led to the creation of Mobius and evolved anthropomorphic animals, try to destroy the planet. Sonic defeats them, only to end up lost in space, but returns home a year later. Sally's father, King Maximillian, is poisoned by Antoine's evil counterpart, Patch, and hands the throne over to his son Prince Elias. For a brief time, Snively defects to the Freedom Fighters only to betray them, bombing Knothole with the Egg Fleet. The citizens are imprisoned in the Egg Grapes, but Sonic frees them. Nicole uses nanites to create New Mobotropolis. Tails’ father Amadeus tries to bring democracy to the city against the monarchy, Sally preventing a civil war by establishing the Council of Acorn, consisting of royal and public officials.

Eggman has a mental breakdown due to his failed attempts to control the planet and is temporarily institutionalized, allowing Snively and the Iron Queen, Regina Ferrum, to take over his empire, leading to a lengthy war against the Freedom Fighters. Naugus comes to rule New Mobotropolis as king, due to a deal Sally's father made with him. Eggman returns to power and sanity, unleashing the Genesis Wave, altering the world, but Sonic reverses it. Sally sacrifices herself to stop Eggman's superweapon, the World Roboticizer, and becomes a robot. The Freedom Fighters reform as Team Freedom, Team Fighters, and the Secret Freedom Fighters to combat Eggman and Naugus.

Eggman activates a second Genesis Wave, transporting himself, Sonic, and other characters into the world of Mega Man, leading to the crossover Worlds Collide. A second crossover Worlds Unite happened in 2015, featuring characters from other Sega and Capcom titles.

The original multiverse ceased to exist when Dr. Eggman launched the Super Genesis Wave in conjunction with Dr. Wily, causing the Prime Zone (Sonic's World Dimension) to be irreversibly rewritten and the multiverse surrounding it to collapse in on itself, destroying every prior known reality (with the exception of the Special Zone and the Sol Zone, Blaze's World Dimension, the latter due to the Jeweled Scepter) and creating new ones in their place.

Sonic and Dr. Eggman maintain their memories of the original continuity, which are then shared with Tails, Sally, Rotor, Antoine, Bunnie, Amy Rose, and Naugus when they make contact with Nicole. However, this world is altered by the second Genesis Wave and Earth is split apart, awakening Dark Gaia, leading to the events of Sonic Unleashed. The comic also introduces Naugus’ sister Wendy, a witch who pledges allegiance to Eggman and plots to gain the Cacophonic Conch.

Spin-offs and other related series
The series was originally published as a four issue mini-series, with the first issue labeled as "issue 0". At the end of the fourth issue of the series, it was announced that Sonic would return in a regular series, and the next issue was published as "issue 1" of the regular series.

Alongside the main Sonic series, Archie Comics published various special issues. Longer than typical issues of the comic, these specials feature stories involving Sonic and other related characters. Several miniseries have also been published, featuring characters such as Sally Acorn, Tails and Knuckles.

Because of the popularity of the specials and Miniseries featuring Knuckles, in 1997, Knuckles the Echidna became an ongoing series. Knuckles' stories featured its own cast of characters, including the Chaotix. In 2000, the series was cancelled, but the stories were continued in the pages of Sonic the Hedgehog until it was phased out completely by Sonic issue 125. In this form, a typical issue of Sonic included a Sonic story and a second, shorter Knuckles story afterwards, though eventually this phased out as well.

To allow for stories that focused more on side characters than primarily on Sonic-most notably the other characters featured in the Sega games-the Sonic Universe comic line was introduced. This series has included a wide range of characters previously introduced in other comic issues, as well as allowing for the introduction of additional characters to the comic cast. Typically, the series is broken up into four-issue long story arcs focusing on a select character or group of characters, though one-issue stories have also been released.

Archie has also produced two Sonic series based on other branches of the Sonic franchise, namely the Sonic X anime and the Sonic Boom cartoon. The Sonic X series began in September 2005, and ended after forty issues in January 2009, the last of which featured a crossover story with the main Sonic the Hedgehog series that served as a prequel to the first Sonic Universe issue. The Sonic Boom line began in October 2014, and was later incorporated into Worlds Unite before concluding with its eleventh issue in September 2015.

The Archie Sonic series has also produced several Free Comic Book Day issues, which typically feature either reprints of older issues or new stories that fit into the series continuity. Since 2013 these issues have served as a combination free comic special with the Mega Man series; a free Sonic issue serving as a prequel to Sonic Lost World was also released in 2013 for Halloween Comic Fest. Various compilations have also been put together, such as the Sonic Saga Series, Sonic Archives and Knuckles Archives, Sonic the Hedgehog, Sonic Universe and standalone graphic novels, Sonic Legacy, Best of Sonic the Hedgehog, Sonic Super Digest and Sonic Super Special Magazine. Following Worlds Collide the latter two series and the Free Comic Book Day issues began featuring stories in a series entitled "Sonic Comic Origins", which detailed the histories of various characters in the post-reboot continuity.

A short, three panel comic strip similar to those found in a newspaper at the end of some issues called Off-Panel. It was originally found in the main series of comics, and was later continued in the spinoff series Sonic Universe. Earlier strips involved fictional version of staff interacting with comic characters, while later strips removed this element, it always retains elements of comical gags relating to the issues main story, often containing fourth wall breaking.

Characters

The comic book has had a large cast of characters, primarily originating from the video games, the 1993 animated series, and other media. A number of characters were created by various writers including Ken Penders, Ian Flynn, Michael Gallagher, Karl Bollers, Scott Fulop, and Dan Slott. Following Penders' lawsuits against Sega and Electronic Arts, and later against Archie Comics, the continuity of the comic was rebooted into a new timeline, removing most of the characters created by previous writers, save Flynn. Due to the large cast, only major and recurring characters are included in this section.

Freedom Fighters
The central protagonists of the comic, the Freedom Fighters are a resistance movement who battle against Dr. Eggman and various other antagonists for the freedom of their planet. The main faction are the Knothole Freedom Fighters, led by Sonic the Hedgehog and Princess Sally Acorn, who operate from the village of Knothole in the Great Forest.

 Sonic the Hedgehog: The main protagonist, a blue hedgehog capable of running at supersonic speeds. The leader of the Knothole Freedom Fighters, Sonic and his friends fight to protect their home from Dr. Eggman and other antagonists. He is characterized as being naturally heroic, cocky, free-spirited, loyal to his friends, and enjoys eating chili dogs. In the original continuity, he was the son of Jules and Bernadette Hedgehog, who were both roboticized. He is viewed as a legendary figure in his home dimension, and throughout the multiverse. In the "Mobius: X Years Later" arc, set in an alternate future, Sonic became King of Mobius, married to his love interest Sally Acorn, and had two children named Sonia and Manic (sharing their names with Sonic's siblings in Sonic Underground). Sonic has shown an ability to transform into super forms, like Super Sonic, when using the power of the Chaos Emeralds and other magical devices.
 Princess Sally Acorn: A 16-year-old chipmunk who is the co-leader of the Freedom Fighters. She was Sonic's main love interest in the old continuity. Sally is a mature, firm, kind, and tomboyish character. Taken to Knothole as a child during Dr. Robotnik's coup d'état, she grew up to lead the Freedom Fighters against the Eggman Empire. In the original continuity, she was daughter of King Maximillian and Queen Alicia, and had an older brother, Prince Elias, who ascended the throne after her father's abdication. Sally had an on-and-off relationship with Sonic, but also had romances with Geoffrey St. John and Monkey Khan. Sally sacrificed herself to protect the world from Eggman's World Roboticizer, and was transformed into Mecha Sally. Following the second Genesis Wave, that created a new continuity, Sally is now the sole heir of King Nigel Acorn, and was never roboticized, regaining her memories of the original timeline. Due to the legal settlement after discharging Ken Penders from the ACP’s premises, the relationship between her and Sonic has explicitly changed as the two are now just friends.
 Miles "Tails" Prower: A young, twin-tailed fox who is Sonic's best friend. At first a supporting character, Tails later became a prominent member of the Freedom Fighters. He was the child of Amadeus and Rosemary Prower, two key figures in the Kingdom of Acorn's government, but both were roboticized, and later rescued by the extraterrestrial species, the Bem. When Tails’ parents attempted to ignite a revolution against the Acorn monarchy, it put Tails in conflict with Sonic until the Republic of Acorn was formed thanks to Sally bringing peace. In "Mobius: X Years Later", Tails married Mina Mongoose and had two children Melody and Skye. After the second Genesis Wave, Tails, regaining his memories of the first continuity, built the Sky Patrol aircraft and is aided by a robot named T-Pup.
 Bunnie Rabbot: An 18-year-old cyborg rabbit, Bunnie was partially roboticized as a child, though this was altered in the new continuity, where Uncle Chuck turned her into a cyborg to save her life from an injury. A courageous, good-natured character, Bunnie speaks with a Southern accent and has ambitions of being a hair stylist. Her mechanical limbs have had several abilities including extensions, rocket-powered flight, and could transform into weapons. In both continuities, Bunnie married Antoine D’Coolette. Her uncle, Beauregard "The Baron" Rabbot, was a member of Eggman's Dark Egg Legion. In "Mobius: X Years Later", Bunnie and Antoine had two children, Jacques and Belle.
 Antoine D'Coolette: A 19-year-old coyote who sports a French accent (starting with issue #10). Initially pompous and bumbling, Antoine hid behind a wall of bravado to hide his anxieties. He had a crush on Sally, but fell in love with and then married Bunnie. He is a skilled swordsman, and is shown to have developed his own take on Sonic's signature Spin Dash manoeuvre. In the original continuity, his father was Armand D’Coolette, a former war general, who was roboticized and served as Dr. Robotnik's High Sheriff in Mercia. He was restored to normal, but was later poisoned by Antoine's evil counterpart Patch D'Coolette. Antoine was knocked into a coma after defending his friends from Metal Sonic, though in the rebooted continuity, his injury never occurred.
 Rotor the Walrus: A large, purple-coloured walrus, Rotor serves as the mechanic and inventor for the Freedom Fighters. Formerly nicknamed "Boomer". Intelligent but laidback and a little lacking in self-confidence, Rotor acts as the muscle of the group. Though a main member of the Freedom Fighters, Rotor took an increasing backseat role as the comic continued, becoming a member of the Council of Acorn, but later become a member of Team Freedom alongside Cream the Rabbit, Big the Cat, and robots Heavy and Bomb. His spine was injured during the destruction of Knothole, leading him to wear a specially-designed suit that could help him in battle. In the rebooted continuity, he has gained a more muscular physique, and built the Sky Patrol with Tails. The reboot also introduced his estranged father Tundra the Walrus, who serves as one of Dr. Eggman's sub-commanders. In 2009, The Sonic Stadium reported that Ken Penders had planned to reveal Rotor as gay in the Mobius: 25 Years Later storyline, but this idea was later dropped because of the gross underdevelopment of the character.
 Nicole: The artificial intelligence of Sally's handheld computer who can appear as a holographic Mobian lynx. Nicole, at first, lacks a personality but developed one over the course of the comic. In the original continuity, Nicole was programmed by a version of Rotor from the future; while in the reboot, she was designed by scientist Dr. Ellidy, based on his deceased daughter Nikki. Nicole was given nanobots obtained from one of Dr. Eggman's creations, allowing her to create and protect the city New Mobotropolis, making her a powerful character in the comic. However, she was brainwashed by the Iron Dominion and attacked the city, something that was later used by the newly crowned King Naugus to have her exiled. In the new continuity, Nicole regains her handheld form, and several characters who make physical contact with her regain their memories from the lost timeline.
 Amy Rose: A pre-teen hedgehog who has a long-standing crush on Sonic. Optimistic, cheerful, and tough, Amy began as a supporting character but evolved into a leading protagonist and a major member of the Freedom Fighters. Amy was introduced as a cousin to Rob O’the Hedge, being rather bratty, immature, and physically, had her character design as seen in Sonic CD. Wishing to become a Freedom Fighter, Amy used the magical Ring of Acorns to physically age herself, now resembling her modern appearance introduced in Sonic Adventure. Amy wields the Pico Pico Hammer in battle, and occasionally, leads Team Rose, which consisted of herself, Cream the Rabbit, Big the Cat, and Blaze the Cat. She later joined Team Fighters alongside Sonic and Tails. Following the continuity reboot, Amy remains a member of the Knothole Freedom Fighters, regaining her memories of the original timeline by touching Nicole alongside Sally.
 Cream the Rabbit and Cheese the Chao: A young, six-year old rabbit and her Chao companion, Cream and Cheese lived an idyllic life with Cream's mother Vanilla until Dr. Eggman invaded. Cream is sweet, kind, and considerate, befriending Amy Rose and the more volatile Blaze the Cat. They are members of Team Rose, and became a part of Team Freedom alongside Rotor, Big, and Chaotix members Heavy and Bomb.
 Big the Cat: A large, simple-minded fisherman cat who lives in the Mystic Ruins, accompanied by his best friend Froggy, who is a frog. Though a little dumb, Big is quite friendly, capable of using his great size and strength to aid the Freedom Fighters. He is a member of Team Rose, later Team Freedom, and then the Knothole Freedom Fighters following the second Genesis Wave.
 Dulcy the Dragon: A supporting member of the Freedom Fighters, Dulcy was one of the last Mobian dragons left unroboticized at the start of the comic's story. She is ditzy, emotional, and clumsy, but loyal to her friends. Following the continuity reboot, Dulcy was given a new character design, and reimagined as a member of the Shijin Warriors in Yurashia.
Lupe the Wolf: A Mobian wolf who is an ally to the Freedom Fighters, and a member of the reclusive Wolf Pack. A brave warrior, Lupe was inspired to oppose Dr. Eggman after meeting Sally, Sonic, and Antoine. In the original continuity, Lupe was chieftain of the Pack, leading them against the Eggman Empire, but when captured by a roboticized Uncle Chuck, she sacrificed herself to be his lone victim and spared her people from enslavement. This was later reversed by the Bem, and Lupe made peace with Chuck.
 Uncle Chuck: Sonic's uncle, originally named Sir Charles Hedgehog and then Professor Charles the Hedgehog, Uncle Chuck played a key role in the rise of both Sonic and Dr. Eggman. The inventor of the original Roboticizer, Uncle Chuck designed it to heal people from life-threatening injuries, such as his brother Jules, only for the original Dr. Robotnik to steal the blueprints and use it to turn people into robotic slaves, known as Robians in the original continuity. Chuck evacuated the young Freedom Fighters during Robotnik's coup d’état, later captured and roboticized himself. He was freed by Sonic's efforts, becoming an ally to the Freedom Fighters as an inventor. Chuck is aided in the new continuity by Ben Muttski, who first existed as Sonic's pet dog, before being reimagined as an anthropomorphic canine.

Supporting protagonists
 Knuckles the Echidna: An echidna who guards the floating Angel Island and the Master Emerald, Knuckles is a prominent character throughout the comic's history, having his own spin-off comic that ran from 1997 to 1999. Knuckles is a single-minded character, focused on his duty protecting his home, but is stubborn, hot-headed, and gullible. His initial backstory differentiated from video game canonicity, the comic introduces a rich cast of characters, created by Ken Penders, most of whom were echidnas. Knuckles guarded the Master Emerald as taught to by his father Locke, but left occasionally to aid the Freedom Fighters and his own team, the Chaotix. He eventually gained a romantic interest, Julie-Su, and in "Mobius: X Years Later", the couple has a daughter named Lara-Su, who would inherit her father's role as guardian of Angel Island. In the new continuity, Knuckles is depicted as the last of his kind.
 Julie-Su (old continuity): Knuckles’ love interest prominently featured in the original continuity. A member of the Chaotix, Julie-Su was a tomboyish, tough character, just as stubborn and temperamental as Knuckles. Raised as a soldier of the echidna-based Dark Legion, Julie was abused by her half-sister Lien-Da, and eventually left to join Knuckles and the Chaotix. Julie-Su and all of the other echidnas were imprisoned in another dimension by Thrash the Tasmanian Devil, a writing decision introduced following Ken Penders’ lawsuit against Archie Comics, removing the character from the comic.
 Lara-Su (old continuity): The daughter of Knuckles and Julie-Su, Lara appeared in the "Light Mobius" timeline originating from "Mobius: X Years Later". Lara wished to inherit her father's role as guardian of the Master Emerald, though Knuckles at first refused her the role due to his own past upbringing. When the timeline was warped by Sonic to save the future, Lara fought to correct it by deposing Shadow the Hedgehog, who had become the new King of Mobius instead of Sonic. Lara eventually became the guardian of the Master Emerald, a role which lasted at least five years. An alternate version of Lara, named Jani-Ca, exists in the "Dark Mobius" timeline, leader of the Dark Freedom Fighters and sought to defeat Dark Enerjak, actually her father Knuckles, Lara then inheriting the mantle of Enerjak.
 The Chaotix: A group of Mobians formed by Knuckles to help the Freedom Fighters, but also work as a detective agency. The original line-up introduced in the comic consisted of Knuckles and Julie-Su; Vector the Crocodile, a detective who serves as the de facto leader; Espio the Chameleon, a quiet, focused ninja; the pacifistic traveller Mighty the Armadillo, and his best friend Ray the Flying Squirrel; hyperactive Charmy Bee, who was initially introduced as the runaway prince of the Golden Hive Colony; his girlfriend Saffron Bee; and the former Badniks, Heavy and Bomb. Julie-Su and Saffron were trapped into another dimension by Thrash the Devil, and following the continuity reboot, only Vector, Espio, and Charmy remain members of the Chaotix, though Knuckles, Mighty, and Ray have past connections to the group.
 Shadow the Hedgehog: A black and red hedgehog, Shadow is an immortal created through Project Shadow, created by Professor Gerald Robotnik, Dr. Eggman's grandfather, and the evil alien Black Doom. Aloof, grumpy, and a lone wolf, Shadow's backstory and role follow the plot introduced in Sonic Adventure 2. Shadow later became a recurring anti-hero, forming Team Dark alongside Rouge the Bat, E-123 Omega, and Hope Kintobor. Like Sonic, Shadow could transform into super forms using the Chaos Emeralds, such as Super Shadow. He has become a recurring protagonist in the Sonic Universe comic.
 Rouge the Bat: A bat who works as a secret agent for the United Federation and is a jewel thief. She is a member of Team Dark, and while good in nature, has had run-ins and allegiances to several antagonists such as Dr. Eggman. Flirtatious and cunning, Rouge maintains a love/hate relationship with Knuckles, but also has a close bond to Shadow and E-123 Omega.
 E-123 Omega: The third member of Team Dark, E-123 Omega was a robot designed by Dr. Eggman. In the old continuity, Omega tried to destroy the still alive E-102 Gamma only for Gamma to self destruct and upload his free will into him, Shadow the Hedgehog (who had been sent by G.U.N to recruit Gamma) then recruited Omega who then joined Team Dark. In the new continuity (which is more closer to the games) his story is just like that of his story from Sonic Heroes. He is a prideful, violent character with a love for destructive force, but remains loyal to his friends despite his chaotic nature.
 Hope Kintobor (old continuity): A human girl introduced in the original continuity, Hope was Dr. Eggman's niece and Snively's half-sister. She and her parents had travelled into space after the Great War to find a new home, but unlike other humans, referred to as Overlanders in the comics, Hope had no animosity towards Mobians. She eventually returned to Mobius, but her family were roboticized, and Hope was taken in by the Freedom Fighters. Hope reconciled with Snively, hoping he would turn over a new leaf, only for her brother to betray the Freedom Fighters and destroyed Knothole with the Egg Fleet. Hope left and eventually joined Team Dark as a support technician.
 Blaze the Cat: The princess of the Sol Dimension, Blaze is the guardian of the Sol Emeralds. Though she acts calm, collected, and reserved, Blaze has a short temper, which is emphasized by her destructive pyrokinesis. Her temper can make it difficult for her to think clearly, and she is distrustful towards others. Blaze has made several appearances in both the main series and the Sonic Universe spin-off. She has appeared as a member of Team Rose, being friends with Amy Rose and Cream.
 Silver the Hedgehog: A telekinetic hedgehog who lives two-hundred years in the future, Silver often travels back in time to avert threats that will affect his own world. Silver is driven by a strong sense of justice, but he is quite naïve, jumping to conclusions, and can be easily manipulated or fooled. In the original continuity, Silver went back in time to identify a supposed traitor in the Freedom Fighters whose betrayal would lead to the post-apocalyptic state of his own era. He misidentifies numerous characters as the traitor before learning Sally is the unintentional culprit upon her roboticization. When Naugus becomes King of New Mobotropolis, Silver is recruited into the Secret Freedom Fighters by spymaster Harvey Who, to quietly dismantle Naugus' regime. The other team members included Sally's brother Elias, Leeta and Lyco Wolf, bad luck magnet Larry Lynx, and Shard, a reprogrammed model of Metallix the Metal Sonic. Following the continuity reboot, Silver's future has altered and he combats the Genesis Portals, a side effect of Eggman's Super Genesis Wave. He is aided by Gold the Tenrec, a telepathic member of the secretive Onyx council, and scientist Professor Von Schlemmer, based on a character introduced in The Adventures of Sonic the Hedgehog.
 King Acorn: Sally's father and the King of Mobotropolis. The King's personality, name, and character greatly differ before and after the continuity reboot. He was betrayed by Dr. Robotnik, his former adviser, and banished to the Special Zone alongside Naugus, who served as his court wizard. In the original continuity, he was King Maximillian Acorn, a troubled ruler whose experiences left him a shadow of his former self, further worsened when poisoned by Antoine's evil counterpart Patch D’Coolette, leaving him wheelchair-bound. Following the second Genesis Wave, the King is reimagined as King Nigel Acorn, younger, jovial, and more considerate.
 Rob O'the Hedge (old continuity): A hedgehog based on Robin Hood, Rob was Amy Rose's cousin and the King of Mercia, operating from Deerwood Forest. Leader of the Crazy Kritter Freedom Fighters, Rob was characterized with a "ye olde" English dialect and a charismatic personality. Like Robin Hood, he was a skilled archer, and worked as a representative of the downtrodden against Dr. Eggman's forces. He married Mari-An, an echidna based on Maid Marian, and a son named Jon. Rob became King following the death of the original Dr. Robotnik, but went into hiding when Eggman's forces targeted his son. He was replaced by Bow Sparrow, a character also heavily based on Robin Hood, leader of the Woodland Kingsmen.
 Geoffrey St. John (old continuity): A skunk who was a recurring member of the Freedom Fighters. Egotistical, self-righteous, and uncompromising, Geoffrey acted as a rival to Sonic, and a love interest towards Sally. He led the Rebel Underground against Dr. Robotnik, crossing paths with the Knothole Freedom Fighters, but became their ally until Robotnik's defeat. He married Hershey the Cat, a long-time friend. He then led the Royal Secret Service on orders from Sally's father King Acorn. Hershey disappeared while on a mission and was presumed dead. It was revealed that Geoffrey actually worked for Naugus as his apprentice, originally assigned to prepare the Kingdom of Acorn for Naugus’ rise to power as King, and he ensured his master's succession to the throne occurred. However, upon seeing how evil Naugus was, Geoffrey tried to defect, only to be possessed by his master. As a creation of Ken Penders, Geoffrey was removed from the comic following the continuity reboot.
 Ken "Monkey" Khan (old continuity): A character heavily inspired by Sun Wukong, Monkey Khan was known as the "King of the Free People", originating from the village Leung West. Captured by Dr. Robotnik and turned into a cyborg, Khan was sealed away for ten years when he proved to be uncontrollable. He was freed by Sally, and became an ally during the war against the Iron Dominion and their allies from the Dragon Kingdom. Being based on Sun Wukong, Khan fights with a quarterstaff and can summon a cloud for transport. He was also a rival of Sonic for Sally's heart, but he stood down so she could mend her relationship with Sonic.
 Mina Mongoose (old continuity): A sixteen-year old musician and singer. Mina was gifted with the ability of super speed by Mammoth Mogul. Her mother Isabella was roboticized, but later freed and served on the Council of Acorn. Initially quiet and shy, Mina became more outspoken as the comic went on. She fell in love with Sonic, spending more time with him, but backed off when she realized he loved Sally. She formed the rock band "Knothole Knuts", and later, the "Forget-Me-Knots", named after Knothole following its destruction. She formed a romantic relationship with band manager Ash Mongoose. In "Mobius: X Years Later", Mina was shown to have married Tails and had two children named Melody and Skye. Mina quietly fades from existence in the second Genesis Wave as Tails regained his memories of the original timeline.
 Nathaniel "Nate" Beauregard Morgan (old continuity): A black Overlander geochemist, Nate is named after a character mentioned in the production bible of the 1993 animated series. He had a long complex history with Dr. Robotnik, exiled from his homeland after an experiment was sabotaged by the latter. He invented the Power Rings, creating the Lake of Rings in what would become Knothole. He became a friend to Sally's grandfather King Frederic, but went into self-exile when Naugus, fearful that technology would replace his influential magic, framed Nate as an Overlander spy. Nate lived in a mountainside castle, accompanied by Eddie the Yeti, a cybernetic mutate. He became an ally to the Freedom Fighters during their battles with Dr. Eggman and Naugus. He aided in the rescue of his people, only to be roboticized by Eggman, and later perished when Robotropolis was destroyed by a nuclear weapon. In the new continuity, a Mobian named Dr. Ellidy, a Mobian lynx, is inspired by Nate, designing the Power Rings and also Nicole, based on his late daughter Nikki.
 Tikal the Echidna: She is the spirit of an ancient Mobian echidna who long ago sealed herself and Chaos within the Master Emerald. The daughter of Knuckles Clan chief, Pachacamac, Tikal rejected her father's warmongering ways to befriend Chaos and the Chao he protected. She is a devout pacifist and follows the teachings of her grandmother. Later, when Chaos was released by Dr. Eggman, she joined forces with Knuckles the Echidna and Sonic the Hedgehog to try and stop his rampage. After her success, Tikal returned to the Master Emerald with Chaos, though the two remained aware of evils afflicting their former home. (A history seen in both continuities and based on Sonic Adventure.) Tikal and Chaos had emerged the shattered Master Emerald during the Super Genesis Wave. She came to the aid of Coral and Pearly to play the Mystic Melody to defeat the Dark Gaia minions.
 Chaos: A mutated Chao, which was responsible for all but wiping out the Knuckles Clan of echidnas. Imprisoned in the Master Emerald by Tikal, a girl from that tribe, Chaos remained trapped for centuries until he was released by the maniacal Dr. Eggman. After accumulating power from various Chaos Emeralds, he attacked Station Square only to be stopped by Super Sonic. Following this, Chaos and Tikal returned to their home within the Master Emerald. (A history seen in both continuities and based on Sonic Adventure.) Chaos and Tikal had emerged from the Master Emerald during the Super Genesis Wave. Chaos went down to Meropis to aid the defenders there, Sonic and Rotor and prevented the ocean from being drained and defeated the Dark Guardian.
 Razor the Shark (new continuity): A former pirate of the Pirates of the Setting Dawn who was rescued and was nursed back to health by Coral the Betta after being thrown overboard by some of his former crewmates. He soon became Coral's protector and the Eusebes Shrine defender after his rescue. He has a Chao companion named Crusher.
 Coral the Betta (new continuity): A young priestess of the Eusebes Temple who was chosen over Princess Undina, her childhood friend. At some point after she was chosen, she had to go through some training to officially become a priestess. She soon took Pearly in as her apprentice and trained her in the rites. During the Shattered World Crisis, she had lost her confidence since Queen Angelica and King Puff thought she had caused it. Tikal soon came to her and Pearly's aid as soon as she was able to and proved she was the right priestess. She gained her confidence back as she was able to restore Aquarius and defeat the Dark Gaia minions. Queen Angelica and King Puff soon saw Coral as the right priestess after that.
 Pearly the Manta Ray (new continuity): A young priestess in training by Coral who also has a fear of Chao.
 Honey the Cat (new continuity): A sixteen-year old fashion designer, businesswoman, and CEO for her company, "Honey Brand Clothing". She's all about self promotion as seen in the Chaos Emerald Tournament. Yet unlike Breezie, she has good morals and is an ally of the Freedom Fighters. When something serious is at stake, she's willing to step down to help. She competed in the Chaos Emerald Tournament only for self promotion. She's an ally of the Freedom Fighters as she promised if she won, she'd give the Chaos Emerald to them. During the fight, she showed a devious side by taking out Tails by ambushing him using a multi-image trick in which he called her out for cheating. Later, she's hired by Breezie to design uniforms for her robot employees. Honey takes this time to call her out for involving Metal Sonic and the Hooligans in the tournament for the sake of getting rich. Honey is a scrapped character from the game Sonic the Fighters, but was redesigned to simplify her complicated outfit. She is based on the character from Fighting Vipers with the same name.
 Relic the Pika (new continuity): An archaeologist and close friend of Knuckles the echidna. When she was able to explore Angel Island, she met Knuckles and convinced him to let her stay. Later, she discovered an ancient robot named Fixit who soon became her assistant.
 Professor "Dillon" Pickle (new continuity): An absent-minded professor from Spagonia, and a long-time friend to Charles Hedgehog. Pickle was kidnapped by Eggman following his research into the Gaia manuscripts, forcing the Freedom Fighters to mount a rescue operation. His research provides a path to save the Shattered World for good.
 Dr. Ellidy (new continuity): Nicole's creator post-Genesis Wave. He has removed himself from normal society and lives by himself, using repurposed badniks for everyday chores.
 Master Moss (new continuity): A zen master sloth who, in the Post Genesis Wave universe, taught Mighty the Armadillo how to channel and hone his incredible strength. After Sonic's Werehog form is unleashed, he helps the hedgehog learn how to control the dark transformation.
 Gemerl the Gizoid (new continuity): An ancient robot rebuilt by Eggman to serve as an enforcer, only to be re-reprogrammed by Tails into a bodyguard for Cream and Cheese. Introduced into the comic during the Worlds Unite crossover.
 Chip the Light Gaia (new continuity): He is an ancient spirit that restores the world whenever it shatters every ten thousandth year, the most recent time being the Shattered World Crisis. He is a close ally of the Freedom Fighters, Chaotix, Knuckles the Echidna, and Tikal the Echidna. His opposite counterpart is Dark Gaia.

Antagonists
 Doctor Eggman: The main antagonist of the series, Dr. Ivo Robotnik, nicknamed Dr. Eggman, wants to conquer the world under the banner of his Eggman Empire. He is a genius with an IQ of 300, commanding a vast army of robots. He often roboticizes his victims into mindless machines subservient to his will alone. Two versions of the character have existed in the comic. The first, formerly Julian Kintobor, based on the character's incarnation from the 1993 animated series, was a power-hungry and misanthropic mad scientist who took over the Kingdom of Acorn after helping King Maximillian win the Great War against the Overlanders. Cruel, sadistic, but also insane, Robotnik grew obsessed with defeating his nemesis Sonic. He died in the comic's fiftieth issue, vaporized by his weapon, the Ultimate Annihilator, its trajectory altered by his nephew Snively. The second character, introduced as "Robo-Robotnik", hails from an alternate timeline where he roboticized himself. Following Dr. Robotnik's death, his counterpart takes over his empire on Mobius Prime, adopting the alias as Dr. Eggman, physically capable of changing his robotic body. Following the continuity reboot, Eggman becomes the singular incarnation of the character, maintaining his memories of the original timeline.
 Snively: Dr. Eggman's nephew and toady, Snively is a diminutive, bald, pointy-nosed human who helped his uncle overthrow King Acorn. However, he is often abused and mistreated by Eggman. Just as cunning and intelligent as Eggman, Snively is passive-aggressive and has a tendency to backstab his allies. Despite several attempts to defect or betray his uncle, Snively always returns to his side, destroying Knothole in one case. He became a member of the Iron Dominion, dating its leader Regina Ferrum. Following the Genesis Waves, Snively was reimagined as Dr. Julian Snively, now sporting glasses and a beard, works for G.U.N., and while unrelated to Eggman, he still assisted in his takeover of the Kingdom of Acorn.
 Metal Sonic: A robotic version of Sonic created by Dr. Eggman, Metallix has served as a recurring rival to Sonic and other characters throughout the comic. There have been several versions of the character. The original model, after being totally destroyed during an eruption of Mt. Mobius, leaving only its personality crystal which had gained free will after watching Sonic refuse to leave Tails behind, was reused by Uncle Chuck to create Shard, a member of the Secret Freedom Fighters, while another was sent to the Sol Zone and later reappeared as the pirate Captain Metal.
 The Hooligans: A trio of criminals who are occasionally employed by Dr. Eggman and other villains to collect bounties or interfere with the Freedom Fighters. The group consists of sniper and jewel thief Nack the Weasel, silent muscle Bark the Polar Bear, and psychotic bomb expert Bean the Dynamite Duck. They are often defeated by Sonic and company, but there are moments where they become dangerously close to killing or otherwise ruining Sonic.
 Walter Naugus: A major antagonist in the comic, Naugus is an evil sorcerer who wishes to conquer the Kingdom of Acorn. His backstory alters between the two continuities. He was banished to the Special Zone alongside King Acorn by a treacherous Dr. Eggman, but later escapes. In the original timeline, he was called Ixis Naugus, a member of the Order of Ixis, founded by Mammoth Mogul. He was created from a fusion of three wizards, the rhinoceros Agunus, the bat Nusgau, and the lobster Suguna, who all fought for mental supremacy, driving Naugus to madness. He recruited Geoffrey St. John as his apprentice to ensure his succession to the throne, later possessing the skunk when his own body began to mutate. Following the Genesis Waves, Naugus is renamed Walter Naugus, and is a troll. His attempt to conquer the Kingdom is thwarted when he regains his memories of his past life by touching Nicole and flees, meeting his sister Wendy Naugus, based on Witchcart from Tails' Skypatrol. He made several attempts to regain his magic (which was siphoned by the first Genesis Wave that happened in the new continuity during Sonic Advance 3), all that culminated into a battle over the Master Emerald with Knuckles. He was eventually defeated and imprisoned in the Kingdom.
 The Dark Legion (old continuity): A technocratic organization of echidnas who served as recurring antagonists towards Knuckles and, to a lesser extent, to the Freedom Fighters. They were formed after the echidnas of Angel Island denounced the empire's advanced technology. All members have cybernetic implants. Notable members include Julie-Su's half-siblings Lien-Da and Kragok, who were both quite abusive and hateful towards her, Kragok's son Remington, and mad scientist Dr. Finitevus. The organization would later join forces with Dr. Eggman, becoming the Dark Egg Legion.
 Dr. Finitevus (old continuity): A mad scientist and former member of the Dark Legion. Once an ambitious scientist, Finitevus was transformed into an albino echidna after using his invention, the Chaos Siphon Suit, to drain Chaos Knuckles’ of his power and restore him to normality. Finitevus became a major antagonist shortly after, most notably bringing about the resurrection of the evil Enerjak using Knuckles as a host, hoping to use him to cleanse the world with fire and death. Deceptive, cunning, and intelligent above all else, Finitevus is known to subtly use his allies or others as pawns for his scheme, and would happily betray them or leave them to die the second he feels their usefulness has ended.
 Enerjak (old continuity): Enerjak was an evil demigod who lacked a physical form, his consciousness possessing several echidnas. He manifested as a villainous alter ego for his host, and harnessed destructive powers. His most notable host was Dimitri, a scientist from Angel Island, who fused with eleven of the Chaos Emeralds and became Enerjak. Losing his power to Mammoth Mogul, Dimitri gained a cybernetic body and changed his ways, uniting the echidna empire, but due to failing health, was reduced to a robotic head. Knuckles later became the fourth Enerjak in both the main continuity, and in the "Dark Mobius" timeline, the title later inherited by Lara-Su.
 Scourge the Hedgehog (old continuity): Sonic's evil counterpart from the parallel world of Moebius. Introduced as Anti-Sonic, Scourge at first resembled Sonic but wore sunglasses and a leather jacket. He made himself King of Moebius after murdering his father, and led the Anti-Freedom Fighters, which consisted of evil versions of Sally, Tails, Rotor, Antoine, Bunnie, and Amy Rose. He gained his signature green fur after trying to trigger a super transformation using the Master Emerald. He later joined and led such groups like the Suppression Squad and the Destructix, accompanied by his girlfriend Fiona Fox, a former Freedom Fighter who betrayed the other members due to past grudges. The group were imprisoned within the Zone Jail by another of Sonic's counterparts, Zonic the Zone Cop, but later escaped back to Moebius.
 Mammoth Mogul (old continuity): An ancient, immortal mammoth who is a talented sorcerer and criminal businessman. He received his intelligence and magical powers upon finding a Chaos Emerald, forming the Order of Ixis to rule over Mobius. Though egotistical and manipulative, he is charismatic, well-cultured, and patient thanks to his immortality. Mogul used his magic to give Mighty his superhuman strength, and Mina her super speed, cursing them with a post-hypnotic mark to forget their encounters and would serve as sleeper agents when needed. After multiple attempts to conquer the world and losing to the Freedom Fighters, Mogul became manager of the Casino Nights Zone, employing old Badniks as employees such as Scratch, Grounder, and Coconuts, waiting to play a long game to ensure his victory. In a possible dystopian future, he would take on Silver the Hedgehog as his ward, teaching him to master his telekinetic abilities and sending him to the past to destroy the traitor of the Freedom Fighters.
 The Iron Dominion (old continuity): A recurring organization who once served under Dr. Eggman's regime until defecting to become their own faction. It was led by the "Iron Queen", the human Regina Ferrum, and the "Iron King", the Mobian ox warlord Jun Kun. Regina grew up in the Overland capital MegaCentral, living as part of a cult that studied technomagic, allowing her control electric impulses and machinery. After her cult's ways were banned, Regina vowed to bring technomagic back to the world. She joined forces with Jun to conquer the Dragon Kingdom, waging war against the ruling clans of the kingdom. The Iron Dominion later joined forces with the Eggman Empire. Jun was defeated in battle, while Regina fell in love with Snively, plotting to take over the Eggman Empire together. However, Snively was secretly imprisoned by his uncle and replaced by a robotic clone to keep the Dominion in line.
 Black Arms: An extraterrestrial race introduced in Shadow the Hedgehog, the Black Arms traverse space on the Black Comet, and are led by the evil Black Doom. The events of Shadow the Hedgehog take place out of sight, Black Doom creates Shadow alongside Professor Gerald Robotnik, intending on using him as a weapon. The Black Comet was destroyed by Shadow. However, another branch of the Black Arms, led by Black Death, invaded Earth following the second Genesis Wave.  A new Ultimate Lifeform, Eclipse the Darkling, was created by the Black Arms, but solely out of alien blood, giving him an inhuman appearance. Black Death was killed by Shadow and G.U.N., but Eclipse remains active.
 The Xorda (old continuity): A powerful extraterrestrial species, the Xorda resemble cycloptic cephalopods that communicate telepathically. They played a major role in shaping Mobius, bombing the planet with Gene Bombs, mutating life and creating the Mobians. They returned a millennia later to exterminate Mobians as they did with mankind, but were repelled by Sonic.
 Breezie the Hedgehog (new continuity): A greedy and devious businesswoman who runs the entire "Breezie Media". During the Chaos Emerald Championship, she rigged the tournament by involving the Hooligans and Metal Sonic in the fights just for the sake of getting rich. After she hired Honey the Cat to design her employees’ uniforms, Honey had called her out for the rigged tournament and Breezie responded by saying "she would soon see it her way" and called Honey out for taking out Tails during the fight. Like Mammoth Mogul during the Pre-Super Genesis Wave, Breezie hired old Badniks as employees in Casino Park such as Scratch, Grounder, and Coconuts.
 Orbot and Cubot: Eggman's two bumbling hench-bots built to be his right-hand men, taking Snively's position after his betrayal and imprisonment.
 Tails Doll: A mysterious Badnik made in the form of a doll that resembles Tails. The Tails Doll is much more than it appears to be at first glance. Used by Eggman for stealthy infiltration and observation missions, it can transform into a monster-like form once its parameters are met. Used by Eggman to try and destroy the shield generator of New Mobotropolis, it finally managed to do so, and then attacked the city just as the second Genesis Wave happened. Following the Super Genesis Wave, it was defeated by Sonic and Tails during its destructive attempt to wreck Mobotropolis. Later repaired by Eggman, it snuck aboard the Sky Patrol and is feeding Eggman updates on the Freedom Fighters progress to obtain the Chaos Emeralds and Gaia Keys.
 Egg Army: The regional Egg Army leaders who lead different Egg Army regions. In the old continuity, the Egg Army (called the Dark Egg Legion) consisted of Sub-Bosses (or Grandmasters) who ran each Egg Army unit. They are Drago Wolf, Razorclaw, Beauregard "The Baron" Rabbot, Cmd. Hugo Brass, Lien-Da, Duck "Bill" Platypus, The Foreman, Lord Mordred Hood, Akhlut the Orca, Bride of the Conquering Storm, and Diesel the Bear. In the new continuity, the Egg Army consisted of Egg Bosses. They are Axel the Water Buffalo, Akhlut the Orca, Lord Mordred Hood, Maw the Thylacine, Nephthys the Vulture, Thunderbolt the Chinchilla, Tundra the Walrus, Battle Lord Kukku XV (he was the leader of the Battlebird Armada in the old continuity), Abyss the Squid, Conquering Storm the Lynx, and Clove and Cassia the Pronghorns (although Cassia was ranked as Co-Egg Boss), with Wendy Naugus later being conscripted as a twelfth Egg Boss following a failed attack on the Empire with her brother Walter. The only regional Egg Army leaders seen in both continuities are Mordred Hood, Akhlut, and Conquering Storm. Although they had redesigns for the reboot (except Mordred Hood).
 Dark Gaia Creatures (new continuity): A race of hostile supernatural monsters tied to a dark mutagenic energy created by Dark Gaia that emerged during the Shattered World Crisis.

Bibliography

Development
Shortly after Archie Comics acquired the rights to produce the comic series, editor Daryl Edelman approached writer Michael Gallagher (whom he worked with at the time on Betty and Veronica) via a phone call on July 23, 1992, to write stories for the comic. Edelman believed that Gallagher was well-suited writing for the comic for several reasons, among them his work over at Marvel Comics. After briefly discussing the series' concept and that the 4-issue miniseries would have 3 self-contained stories in each issue, Gallagher was told by Edelman to "establish the characters quickly through strong exposition" using "visuals from the game" (which would be faxed to him) and needed the first script in a week. After taking the job, he went to work and received a full page of "Sonic Line Art" (showing the character in various poses), 4 pages of model sheets showing illustrations of the characters, and 3 pages of character descriptions, locations, and the series' back story. He later recalled that the characters eventually became "very familiar to him and began to suggest their own stories". After the miniseries, he ceased being the only writer of the issues, though he continued to contribute throughout its run.

Legal issues

Ken Penders lawsuit 
In January 2009, three years after leaving the comic, former head writer Ken Penders filed for copyright over every story and character that he had created for Sonic the Hedgehog and its spin-offs during his run at Archie Comics, with the U.S. Copyright Office approving his claims in 2010. Penders planned on continuing his "Mobius 25 Years Later" story independently, and declared that everything using his copyrighted works since issue #160 of the main comic was "essentially unauthorised". He had been prompted to do so after fans contacted him asking if he had anything to do with the release of Sonic Chronicles: The Dark Brotherhood, which he did not; Penders believed the game used concepts and characters similar to those he had written for the comic series. That same year, Archie Comics filed a lawsuit against Penders, aiming to retain copyright over its stories and characters; Archie alleged that Penders had violated his contract with them. However, Archie were unable to produce the original copy of their contract with Penders, nor those of any other artist who had ever worked on Sonic, opening them for future lawsuits.

In 2013, the lawsuit ended in prejudice, with Penders gaining the rights to an estimated over 200 characters from the comic in a confidential settlement with Archie Comics. He would later turn the "Mobius 25 Years Later" continuation project into The Lara Su Chronicles, a still-in-development graphic novel; Archie would initially write his characters out of future comics, rewriting issues mid-lawsuit to remove any references to them and not republishing stories involving them, before rebooting the canon entirely to retcon out not only his but any other former writers' original characters and concepts fully.

Scott Fulop lawsuit 
In 2016, after seeing the success of the Penders lawsuit, former Sonic editor Scott Fulop filed suits against Archie Comics and Sega, claiming that he had made 15 characters for the comic series and was owed six figures in royalties. He cited the Penders case as justification for his claims, and gave nearly a thousand examples of times Archie had allegedly wrongly used his characters or reprinted stories involving them. Fulop, through his company Narrative Ark, sought damages for copyright infringement by both Archie and Sega, as they had apparently failed to compensate him for his works; he also sought to invalidate copyrights on his characters filed by Archie in 2011 in response to Penders's own copyright filings. However, the suits were dismissed in the defendants' favour, as Narrative Ark provided insufficient evidence for their claims.

Reception
The comic has been received positively. Destructoid praised the comic series, especially the earlier issues during the 1990s, for adding more backstory and character interaction than was presented in the Sonic video games for the Sega Genesis.

See also

Knuckles the Echidna (comics)
Sonic the Comic
Sonic Universe
Sonic X (comics)
Archie Comics
Mega Man (Archie Comics)
Sonic Boom (comics)
Sonic the Hedgehog (IDW)

Notes

References

External links

 Archie Comics' Sonic the Hedgehog homepage
 SEGA's official page for the Sonic comics
 Interview: Daryl Edelman On His Comic Book Journeys & More! Interview with Editor for Sonic the Hedgehog comic book, Daryl Edelman, by Nicholas Yanes

1993 comics debuts
2016 comics endings
Archie Comics titles
Comics based on Sonic the Hedgehog
Comics based on television series
Comics based on video games
Fantasy comics
Malware in fiction
Comics about parallel universes
Comics set on fictional planets
Sonic the Hedgehog
Comic book reboots
Superhero comics
Works subject to a lawsuit